Polypoetes villia is a moth of the family Notodontidae first described by Herbert Druce in 1897. It is found in Panama and Costa Rica.

The larvae feed on Malvaviscus arboreus and Malvaviscus palmanus.

References

Moths described in 1897
Notodontidae